The Capetian House of Courtenay, also known simply as the House of Courtenay, was a royal house and cadet branch of the direct House of Capet, also known as the Royal House of France. Founded by Peter I of Courtenay, a son of King Louis VI of France, the family drew its name from the lordship of Courtenay, to which Peter's wife was heiress.

Capetian house of Courtenay 

The marriage of Peter I of Courtenay, also known as Peter of France, with Elizabeth, heiress of the elder branch of the lords of Courtenay, took place in 1150. They have numerous descendants, mainly through their sons Peter II of Courtenay (for the elder branch) and Robert of Courtenay (for the younger branch).

The elder branch 

Peter II of Courtenay (eldest son of Peter of France, Lord of Courtenay and Elizabeth) became Count of Auxerre, Nevers and Tonnerre by his marriage with the Countess Agnes of Nevers. After the death of his first wife, he married Yolanda of Flanders. In 1216, on the death of his wife's brother, the Latin Emperor of Constantinople Henry of Flanders, the barons of Constantinople chose Peter II of Courtenay to succeed him; but he was captured while attempting to reach Constantinople and died in captivity in 1219.

His son, Robert of Courtenay, attempted to keep the empire by selling their possessions (including the Marquisate of Namur). The Emperor Robert was expelled from Constantinople by his subjects in 1228. His brother and successor Baldwin II of Constantinople lost the crown when Constantinople was taken by the Greeks (1261), and died in exile in Italy in 1273. His granddaughter, Catherine of Courtenay, married in 1300 Charles of Valois, son of Philip III of France, and the lands of the Courtenay passed into the House of France.

The younger branch 

Robert, the second son of Peter of France and Elizabeth of Courtenay, received some lordships, including that of Champignelles. One of his sons, Peter of Courtenay, Lord of Conches, accompanied Saint Louis in the Holy Land during the Seventh Crusade; he was killed at the Battle of Mansurah (1250), along with the king's brother, Robert I, Count of Artois. His only daughter Amicie de Courtenay married Robert II, Count of Artois, the son of Robert of Artois. In 1285, Robert II of Courtenay, Lord of Champignelles (grandson of Robert) became the head of the House of Courtenay at the death of Philip of Courtenay, son of the Emperor Baldwin II Courtenay.

After the extinction of the members of the senior branch, the Courtenay family fell into oblivion. They had become minor provincial lords, since the elder branch had sold most of the family's possessions in their attempt to preserve the Latin Empire in the east. One of the descendants of Robert de Courtenay, John III of Courtenay-Champignelles, was taken prisoner by the English at the Battle of Poitiers in 1356, and later he fought alongside Bertrand du Guesclin. His nephew Peter III of Courtenay-Champignelles became chamberlain and advisor to King Charles VI. Another member of the family, François de Courtenay-Bléneau is knighted at Marignan (1515), and Anne de Courtenay, another descendant of Robert, in 1583 became the first wife of Maximilien de Béthune, Duke of Sully.

The title of Head of the House of Courtenay is transmitted over time from one branch to another, in 1472 to John II of Courtenay, Lord of Bléneau, then in 1655 to Louis de Courtenay, Lord of Chevillon. From 1603, they tried in vain to gain recognition, many times, the status of "princes of royal blood." The last male of the final branch died in 1733, and the family was extinguished on June 29, 1768, with the death of his niece, Helen of Courtenay (1689–1768), marquise of Bauffremont.

The claim to princely status 

While the wars in Constantinople were unfortunate to the French in general, its loss was dearer still to the Courtenay family. Having had the honor of an imperial dignity, they had spared no cost in order to preserve it, but found that it could not be kept. The grandeur and wealth of the family was lost, that when the time came for the princes of Capetian lineage to be exalted above others, the Courtenays, who would have been best entitled in more ancient times, could no longer be esteemed princes of the blood in France.

Louis VI of France
 Louis VII of France
  Philip II of France
  Louis VIII of France
  Louis IX of France
 Philip III of France
 Philip IV of France
   House of Valois
   House of Bourbon
  Peter I of Courtenay
   House of Courtenay

With the establishment of the Salic law in France, the male-line descendants of the third race of the kings of France were recognized as princes of the blood, who had the contingent right of succession to the French crown. Though the House of Courtenay multiplied, they did so in obscurity and poverty. From princes they became barons, and from barons they became rural lords. Compared to the mighty princes of the blood — the dukes of Burgundy, Brittany, Orléans, Anjou, Bourbon, and Alençon — the royal blood seemed like a drop in the lords of Champignelles and Tanlay. Their name had largely disappeared in the history of the kingdom, but might still be found by the patience and diligence of heralds and genealogists. In the 16th century, the accession of the House of Bourbon, itself distantly related to the preceding House of Valois, awoke the princely spirit of the Courtenays. They appealed to the justice and compassion of Henry IV of France; they obtained a favorable opinion of 20 lawyers from Italy and Germany, and compared themselves to the descendants of King David, whose rights were not impaired by the lapse of ages or the trade of a carpenter. But every ear was deaf, and every circumstance was adverse, to their lawful claims. The princes of the blood, more recent and lofty, disdained the alliance of this humble kindred. The parliament, without denying their proofs, eluded them by arbitrarily selecting St. Louis as the progenitor of the royal line. A repetition of complaints and protests was repeatedly disregarded; and the hopeless pursuit was terminated in the 18th century by the death of the last male of the family.

Notes

References

Sources